Proserpine (Proserpina) is an opera with music by Jean-Baptiste Lully and a libretto by Philippe Quinault first performed at Saint-Germain-en-Laye on 3 February 1680.

Roles

Synopsis
Based on Ovid's Metamorphoses, the plot centers around the abduction of Proserpine by Pluton, with side plots concerning Cérès's love for Jupiter and the love intrigue between Alphée and Aréthuse.

Recordings
Proserpine, soloists, Le Concert Spirituel, conducted by Hervé Niquet (Glossa, 2 CDs, 2008)
Proserpine, CMD German Opera Company of Berlin, conducted by Gertrude Heinz (CMD Recordings, digital download, 2022)

References

Further reading
The New Grove French Baroque Masters, ed. Graham Sadler (Macmillan, 1986)
The Viking Opera Guide, ed. Amanda Holden (Viking, 1993)
Le magazine de l'opéra baroque by Jean-Claude Brenac (in French)

External links 
 

Operas by Jean-Baptiste Lully
French-language operas
Operas based on classical mythology
Operas
1680 operas
Proserpina
Rape of Persephone
Operas based on Metamorphoses